South Bank railway station may refer to:

South Bank railway station (England), a station on the Tees Valley line in North Yorkshire
South Bank railway station, Brisbane, on the Gold Coast line in Queensland, Australia